Eternity, in common parlance, means infinite time that never ends or the quality, condition, or fact of being everlasting or eternal. Classical philosophy, however, defines eternity as what is timeless or exists outside time, whereas sempiternity corresponds to infinite duration.

Philosophy 

Classical philosophy defines eternity as what exists outside time, as in describing timeless supernatural beings and forces, distinguished from sempiternity which corresponds to infinite time, as described in requiem prayers for the dead. Some thinkers, such as Aristotle, suggest the eternity of the natural cosmos in regard to both past and future eternal duration. Boethius defined eternity as "simultaneously full and perfect possession of interminable life". Thomas Aquinas believed that God's eternity does not cease, as it is without either a beginning or an end; the concept of eternity is of divine simplicity, thus incapable of being defined or fully understood by humankind.

Thomas Hobbes (1588–1679) and many others in the Age of Enlightenment drew on the classical distinction to put forward metaphysical hypotheses such as "eternity is a permanent now".

Contemporary philosophy and physics 
Today cosmologists, philosophers, and others look towards analyses of the concept from across cultures and history. They debate, among other things, whether an absolute concept of eternity has real application for fundamental laws of physics; compare the issue of the entropy as an arrow of time.

Religion 

Eternity as infinite duration is an important concept in many lives and religions. God or gods are often said to endure eternally, or exist for all time, forever, without beginning or end. Religious views of an afterlife may speak of it in terms of eternity or eternal life. Christian theologians may regard  immutability, like the eternal  Platonic forms, as essential to eternity.

Symbolism 

Eternity is often symbolized by the endless snake, swallowing its own tail, the ouroboros. The circle, band, or ring is also commonly used as a symbol for eternity, as is the mathematical symbol of infinity, . Symbolically these are reminders that eternity has no beginning or end.

See also

Notes

References

Works cited

Further reading

External links 
 Entry in the Stanford Encyclopedia of Philosophy on Eternity.
 Entry in the Internet Encyclopedia of Philosophy on the relationship between God and Time.

Concepts in metaphysics
Philosophy of science
Philosophy of time
Philosophy of religion
Infinity